Pinchuhridhayam is a 1966 Indian Malayalam-language film,  directed by M. Krishnan Nair and produced by T. E. Vasudevan. The film stars Prem Nazir, Kaviyoor Ponnamma, Adoor Bhasi and Muthukulam Raghavan Pillai. The film was scored by V. Dakshinamoorthy.

Cast
Prem Nazir
Kaviyoor Ponnamma
Adoor Bhasi
Muthukulam Raghavan Pillai
Sankaradi
T. S. Muthaiah
Ambika
Master Prabha
Master Rameshkanna

Soundtrack
The music was composed by V. Dakshinamoorthy with lyrics by P. Bhaskaran.

References

External links
 

1966 films
1960s Malayalam-language films
Films directed by M. Krishnan Nair